Holding Absence is a rock band from Cardiff, Wales, formed in 2015. The group consists of lead vocalist Lucas Woodland, guitarist Scott Carey, bassist Benjamin Elliot and drummer Ashley Green.

The band released an initial collection of singles in 2017, as well as a split EP with Loathe in 2018, before finally releasing their debut record, Holding Absence, in 2019. They are signed with SharpTone Records.

History

2015–2018: Formation, singles and the This Is as One EP 
The band initially formed in 2015, fronted by vocalist Zac Vernon who appears on their first recorded and released tracks, including "Immerse" and "Luna". However, he soon parted ways with the band and formed Parting Gift leaving the door open to Lucas Woodland of defunct outfit, Falling With Style.

Upon Lucas joining the band in 2016, Holding Absence released "Permanent", their debut single under this iteration. The band would soon go on to follow up the release of "Permanent" with their contrasting single "Dream of Me", gaining the attention of US-based record label "Sharptone Records".

In 2017, the band signed with SharpTone Records, with a physical release of the double-A side single Permanent/Dream of Me. The following few months were spent touring the UK alongside several bands, including Blood Youth and We Are The Ocean, before eventually performing at the prestigious Download Festival in Donington.

Soon after Download, the band released their third single "Penance", a six-minute track about "the journey towards happiness". Before the year was out, the band toured the UK again supporting Young Guns, and soon after released their fourth single "Heaven Knows".

Before the end of the year, Holding Absence announced a surprise split EP with label mates Loathe, as well as releasing their fifth single "Saint Cecilia". This Is as One was released in March 2018, accompanied by a unique co-headline tour with the two bands. According to Woodland, "the split came about both at a stage in our careers where we could have benefited from releasing music, but also we wanted to do something a little different". This tour was Holding Absence's first foray into European territory and on the UK leg the bands opted to hand-pick the support acts for each date, including artists such as Sleep Token, Modern Error and Parting Gift.

2018–2019: Line-up changes and the release of Holding Absence
Soon after returning from the This Is as One tour, founding member and guitarist Feisal El-Khazragi left the band, it was later announced that he had joined Loathe on bass duties.

A new-look Holding Absence (including future guitarists Scott Carey and Chris Smitheram) made their first live appearances at Slam Dunk Festival, before jetting off to Europe again, this time to support Being As An Ocean. The band went on to win the Cardiff Music Award for "Best Breakthrough Band", as well as being nominated at the Heavy Music awards for the "Best UK Breakthrough Band". After finishing the summer by playing sporadic UK festivals Holding Absence went on to close the year off with their biggest tour yet supporting fellow UK Post-Hardcore band As It Is, alongside Trash Boat and Courage My Love.

In support of this tour, Holding Absence released "Like A Shadow", the first single off the, at the time, unannounced debut album. After the uncertainty with the band's line-up earlier in the year, Like A Shadow was seen as a reintroduction to the band and their new line-up.

Later in the year, Holding Absence announced their debut, self-titled record would be released on 8 March 2019. They released 3 more singles before the album release, Perish, You Are Everything and Monochrome.

Woodland mentions in several interviews how hard the song-writing process was. In regards to El-Khazragi's leaving the band he said that the "line-up change happened not just mid-album, but mid-recording" and how the band "were left having to write and record another half of the album" without him. The record was also recorded in two parts, which caused the band further complications while trying to get it finished. Woodland believes that the changes benefitted the record in the end, as tracks like "Wilt", "Monochrome" and "Like A Shadow" wouldn't have existed if the band remained in its original form.

Holding Absence was finally released via Sharptone Records on 8 March and was instantly received well critically and commercially. Kerrang gave it 4K's stating that the album was a "brilliantly told tale of love and life, and a superb example of how to stretch the limits of what Post-Hardcore can achieve.", as well as giving the album a 9/10, Dead Press! expressed, though a long-time coming, Holding Absence "prove[d] that art cannot be rushed, relinquishing a stellar debut that bares the human soul, emotion, and conviction in abundance" Loudwire named it one of the 50 best rock albums of 2019.

In aid of the record release, Holding Absence started touring, playing some of their biggest UK shows to date, joined by Luke Rainsford and The Nightmares. Holding Absence spent the remainder of the year touring Europe with Being As An Ocean and Counterparts in the summer, before returning again alongside Sleeping With Sirens in the winter.

2020–present: The Greatest Mistake of My Life
On 21 October 2020, the band announced their second full-length album, The Greatest Mistake of My Life. With the release of the second single "Afterlife", James Joseph left the band leaving Holding Absence with no original members left.
The Greatest Mistake of My Life was released on 16 April 2021. It was elected by Loudwire as the 7th best rock/metal album of 2021, and the 5th best rock/metal album of 2021 by Kerrang.

Members

Current members

 Ashley Green – drums 
 Lucas Woodland – vocals, keyboard 
 Scott Carey – guitar , backing vocals 
 Benjamin Elliott – bass

Former members
 Zac Vernon – vocals 
 Giorgio Cantarutti – guitar 
 Feisal "Fez" El-Khazragi – guitar 
 Chris Smitheram – guitar 
 James Joseph – bass

Touring members
 Michael McGough - guitar, backing vocals 
 Toby Evans - guitar, backing vocals 
 Olly Meager – guitar

Timeline

Discography

Albums

EPs

Singles

Music videos

References

2015 establishments in Wales
Musical groups established in 2015
Musical groups from Cardiff
British post-hardcore musical groups
Welsh rock music groups